Kaire Kimsen (born 13 March 1978) is an Estonian former footballer who played as a defender for the Estonia women's national team.

Career
Kimsen played for the Estonia national team 17 times between 1996 and 2002, playing alongside her older sister Kadri Kimsen on eight of those occasions. Kaire and Kadri Kimsen were the first pair of sisters to represent the Estonian national football team.

Personal life
Her niece, Marie Heleen Lisette Kikkas, is also an Estonian international footballer and debuted in December 2020.

References

1978 births
Living people
Women's association football defenders
Estonian women's footballers
Estonia women's international footballers
People from Saue Parish